Gold coins are coins made mostly or entirely of gold.

Gold coin or gold coins may also refer to:

Gold Coins (film), a 2017 Malayalam feature film
Gold Coins, a song from Sucker (album) by Charli XCX